Idaho Kid is a 1936 American Western film directed by Robert F. Hill and starring Rex Bell, Marion Shilling and David Sharpe.

Plot
Following the death of his mother in childbirth, Todd Hollister's father has nothing to do with him. He is raised by Hollister's arch rival on the range, John Endicott. Keeping his identity a secret, Todd and his young sidekick get a job with the Hollister ranch with the idea to stop the feud. Others wish the feud to continue for their own profit.

Cast
 Rex Bell as Todd Hollister aka Idaho
 Marion Shilling as Ruth Endicott
 David Sharpe as The Kid
 Earl Dwire as Clint Hollister
 Lafe McKee as John Endicott
 Charles King as Bibb Slagel
 Phil Dunham as Tumblebug Jones
 Lane Chandler as Jess Peters
 Dorothy Wood as Mrs. Endicott

References

Bibliography
 Pitts, Michael R. Poverty Row Studios, 1929-1940. McFarland & Company, 2005.

External links
 
 

1930s American films
1930s English-language films
1936 films
1936 Western (genre) films
American Western (genre) films
Films directed by Robert F. Hill
Films with screenplays by George H. Plympton